Bromide Basin (elevation ) is a basin in Garfield County, Utah, United States.

Bromide Basin took its name from a nearby mine which was originally erroneously thought to contain bromide ore.

References

Landforms of Garfield County, Utah